"Morning Star" is a song by British hip hop group N-Dubz. It was the final song to be released following the announcement of their two-year hiatus confirmed by the members earlier that year. The song was released via digital download on 14 March 2011. The song was produced by Free School and written by Jean Baptiste, Nick Marsh, Ryan Buendia, S. Gordon and Michael McHenry.

Composition
"Morning Star" was described in The Guardian as an R&B song. The beginning of the track samples "You Get What You Give" by the New Radicals.

Music video

The music video was uploaded to YouTube by All Around the World on 8 February 2011. The video begins with large text saying: "N-DUBZ" in capital letters, a change from their traditional logo. Inside it, we see a silhouette of the group and the rest of the screen fades to the shot, the silhouettes then fade into the full appearance of the group. The group sing in front of a plain backdrop, occasionally in front of special effects. Throughout the video, shots of space and shooting stars are seen, as well as a female dancer.

Track listing
 "Morning Star" (Radio Edit) - 3:07

Credits and personnel
Lead vocals – N-Dubz
Producers – Free School
Lyrics –  Jean Baptiste, Ryan Buendia, Nick Marsh, S. Gordon, Michael McHenry
Label: AATW, Island, Def Jam

Charts

References

N-Dubz songs
2011 singles
Songs written by Ryan Buendia
Songs written by Michael McHenry
Songs written by Nick Marsh
Songs written by Jean-Baptiste (songwriter)
2010 songs
Island Records singles
Def Jam Recordings singles